Hardcover is a 2008 German comedy film directed by Christian Zübert.

Cast 
 Wotan Wilke Möhring as Dominik 'Nick' 'Dom' Adler
 Lucas Gregorowicz as Christoph 'Goethe' Kreiss
 Justus von Dohnányi as Chico Waidner
 Anna Dereszowska as Ewa
 Lisa Potthoff as Sandy 
 Charly Hübner as Klaus
 Filip Peeters as Kommissar Jürgens
 Sybille J. Schedwill as Chefin Autovermietung 
 Eric Bouwer as Captain Cock
 Sebastian Kroehnert as Sir Fuckalot
 Daniel Flieger as Claus von Punani
 Ioan Gyuri Pascu as Thailand Emil

References

External links 

2008 films
2008 comedy films
German comedy films
2000s German-language films
2000s German films
Films produced by Sönke Wortmann